"Toubab" , "Toubabou" or "Toubob" is a Central and West African name for a person of European descent ("whites"). Used most frequently in The Gambia, Senegal, Guinea, and Mali, and also in Ivory Coast. The word can also be applied to any perceived traveler, usually only those with a different phenotype, up to foreign-raised locals (thus with a different accent) or visiting expatriates. In Alex Haley's book Roots, the word is spelled "toubob", and the phrase "toubob fa" (kill toubob) is used several times.

In God's Bits of Wood, authored by Senegalese Sembene Ousmane, the natives call the French colonizers toubab (singular) or toubabs (plural).

In the fourth episode of the Roots Miniseries, Kizzy refers to her slave masters as "toubab", or white.

Etymology 
The origin of the word is disputed. A verb in the Wolof language means "to convert" (missionaries during colonial times, being whites coming from Europe). The word could have derived from the two bob (two shillings) coin of pre-decimalization United Kingdom.

Related 
In Ghana, the word used in the local Akan languages for a white person (or any foreigner) is Obroni.

In Nigeria, the word used for a white person is Oyibo.

In Togo and Benin, the word used for a white person is yovo.

In Burkina Faso's most common language (Moore), the word for white person is nassara (derived through Arabic from the name Nazareth, place of birth of Jesus). In the country's west, more popular languages (e.g., Dyula, Bambara and Mandinka) use the word toubabou. The word nassara is also used in neighbouring Niger.

French-speaking persons may also use the French word blanc (white).

Central and East Africa 

In East Africa and Eastern part of the Democratic Republic of Congo, the word used for a white person or a foreigner is muzungu.

In both the Democratic Republic of the Congo and the Republic of the Congo another word used for a white person is mondele (or mundele).

Sources

François Bouchetoux, Writing Anthropology: A Call for Uninhibited Methods, Palgrave Macmillan, New York, 2014, 121 p. 
Maurice Delafosse, « De l'origine du mot Toubab »  in  Annuaire et mémoires du comité d'études historiques et scientifiques de l'A.O.F., 1917, p. 205-216
Anne Doquet, « Tous les toubabs ne se ressemblent pas. Les particularités nationales des étrangers vues par les guides touristiques maliens », in Mali - France : Regards sur une histoire partagée, GEMDEV et Université du Mali, Karthala, Paris ; Donniya, Bamako, 2005, p. 243-258  
Pierre Dumont, Le Toubab, L'Harmattan, Paris, Montréal, 1996, 127 p.   (Novel)
Charles Hoareau, Toubabs et immigrés, Pantin, Paris, Le Temps des cerises, VO éd, 1999, 202 p. 
Lawrence Hill, "The Book of Negroes", HarperCollins, Toronto, 2007, 44, 45 p. 

Toubab.com - 
dic.lingala.com : dictionnaire de lingala en ligne 
European diaspora in Africa
Ethnonyms